David Fisher (December 3, 1794 – May 7, 1886) was a U.S. Representative from Ohio.

Biography
David Fisher was born in Somerset County, Pennsylvania, and moved with his parents to Point Pleasant, Ohio in 1799.

He pursued preparatory studies and became a lay preacher and newspaper contributor. Fisher served as member of the State house of representatives in 1834 and later was an unsuccessful candidate for governor in 1844. In 1846 he was editor and proprietor of a newspaper in Wilmington, Ohio.

Fisher was elected as a Whig to the Thirtieth Congress (March 4, 1847 – March 3, 1849) and was not a candidate for renomination in 1848.
While in Congress he occupied a seat next to John Quincy Adams, who fell into his arms when stricken with paralysis. Fisher returned to Cincinnati, Ohio where he resumed newspaper activities and was city magistrate in 1849 and 1850.

He died near Mount Holly, Ohio, May 7, 1886 and is interred in Wesleyan Cemetery, Cincinnati, Ohio.

Sources

1794 births
1886 deaths
Members of the Ohio House of Representatives
People from Somerset County, Pennsylvania
Politicians from Cincinnati
19th-century American newspaper publishers (people)
Whig Party members of the United States House of Representatives from Ohio
19th-century American politicians
Journalists from Ohio
People from Clermont County, Ohio